Paul Arnold (June 29, 1893February 17, 1973) was a Michigan politician.

Early life
Arnold was born on June 29, 1893 in Neckarwestheim, Württemberg, Germany. Arnold was orphaned in 1907. Arnold moved to Philadelphia, Pennsylvania where he learned about the butcher business.

Career
In 1912, Arnold moved to Detroit. There, Arnold worked in the meat industry for 1913 to 1923. Arnold became a naturalized citizen in 1924. Arnold was an alternate delegate to Republican National Convention from Michigan in 1932 and 1936. In 1944, Arnold ran unsuccessfully to become a member of the Michigan House of Representatives from Wayne County 1st district. On November 5, 1946, Arnold was elected as a member of the Michigan House of Representatives from Wayne County 1st district where he served from January 1, 1947 to 1948. Arnold was not re-elected in 1948, was defeated again in both 1950 and 1952.

Personal life
Arnold married Lillian Kroepel in November 26, 1914. Together they had three children.

Death
Arnold died in last place of residence, St. Petersburg, Florida, on February 17, 1973. Arnold was interred at Royal Palm South Cemetery in St. Petersburg, Florida.

References

1893 births
1973 deaths
Burials in Florida
Politicians from Detroit
Republican Party members of the Michigan House of Representatives
German emigrants to the United States
20th-century American politicians
Naturalized citizens of the United States